Houghton Township is a civil township of Keweenaw County in the U.S. state of Michigan.  The population was 103 at the 2020 census. 

The township consists of a mainland portion of the Keweenaw Peninsula and the county seat of Eagle River, as well as the unpopulated northeast portion of Isle Royale National Park.

Communities
This settlement developed around the successful Central Mine, which began operating in 1854. A post office named Central Mine opened on December 8, 1871 in what was then part of Sherman Township, as seen in an 1873 map of Keweenaw County. The name changed to Centralmine on June 30, 1894 and was disestablished on September 15, 1904. The mine itself closed in 1894.  
It is also the county seat of Keweenaw County.
It is the main access point for visitors to the national park and is also the northernmost community in the state, although it is uninhabited during the colder months.
The area was first settled by Joel Vaugh, who bought land here in 1849. He platted the village, but the settlement dwindled following his death in 1862.

Geography

Due to its surrounding water boundaries, it ranks as the third-largest municipality by total area after McMillan Township and Eagle Harbor Township, although Houghton Township has the largest water boundaries of any municipalities in the state.

Major highways
 runs west–east through the central portion of the township.
 enters the township concurrently with US 41 until it branches off to the north in Phoenix.

Demographics
As of the 2000 United States Census, there were 204 people, 45 households, and 26 families in the township. The population density was 1.7 per square mile (0.6/km). There were 273 housing units at an average density of 2.2 per square mile (0.9/km). The racial makeup of the township was 58.33% White, 36.76% African American, 0.98% Native American, 0.49% Asian, 0.98% from other races, and 2.45% from two or more races. Hispanic or Latino of any race were 4.90% of the population. 16.5% were of Finnish, 10.6% English, 9.4% Irish, 8.8% Italian, 6.5% German and 5.3% Norwegian ancestry.

There were 45 households, out of which 13.3% had children under the age of 18 living with them, 51.1% were married couples living together, 6.7% had a female householder with no husband present, and 42.2% were non-families. 42.2% of all households were made up of individuals, and 17.8% had someone living alone who was 65 years of age or older. The average household size was 1.89 and the average family size was 2.54.

The township population contained 51.5% under the age of 18, 13.2% from 18 to 24, 9.3% from 25 to 44, 16.7% from 45 to 64, and 9.3% who were 65 years of age or older. The median age was 18 years. For every 100 females, there were 385.7 males. For every 100 females age 18 and over, there were 167.6 males.

The median income for a household in the township was $28,750, and the median income for a family was $41,250. Males had a median income of $32,500 versus $21,875 for females. The per capita income for the township was $8,505. None of the families and 7.0% of the population were living below the poverty line, including no under eighteens and 9.1% of those over 64.

Notes

References

Sources

External links
Houghton Township official website

Townships in Michigan
Townships in Keweenaw County, Michigan
Houghton micropolitan area, Michigan
Populated places established in 1861
1861 establishments in Michigan
Michigan populated places on Lake Superior